Ann Weatherall (born 1964) is a New Zealand psychology academic, currently professor of psychology at Victoria University of Wellington. Her research methodologies include discursive psychology and conversation analysis and interests include 'the relationships between gendered patterns of social disadvantage, language and discourse.' In 2014 she received a Marsden Grant to investigate rape culture. She has been an editor of the 'Women's Studies Journal'.

Selected works 
 Weatherall, Ann. Gender, language and discourse. Routledge, 2005.
 Weatherall, Ann, and White, Jo. "A grounded theory analysis of older adults and information technology." Educational Gerontology 26.4 (2000): 371–386.
 Ulrich, Miriam, and Ann Weatherall. "Motherhood and infertility: Viewing motherhood through the lens of infertility." Feminism & Psychology 10.3 (2000): 323–336.
 Bayard, D., Weatherall, Ann, Gallois, C., & Pittam, J. (2001). Pax Americana? Accent attitudinal evaluations in New Zealand, Australia and America. Journal of Sociolinguistics, 5(1), 22–49.

References

External links
 google scholar 
 institutional homepage

1964 births
Living people
Academic staff of the Victoria University of Wellington
New Zealand women academics
Recipients of Marsden grants